Turán is a Hungarian periodical. First it was issued during the years 1913, and 1917 through 1918. From 1998 it is being issued again bi-monthly by the Hungarian company "Magyar Őstörténeti Kutató és Kiadó Kht." ("Researcher and Publisher of Hungarian Prehistory Ltd."; editors in chief: Ferenc Lovass 1998–2000, Előd Esztergály 2000-).

References

ISSN 1418-3307 Note: Some online databases use this ISSN to refer to the Factiva online database entry called "Turan (Azerbaijan, Russian Language)". However, the original Factiva database entry does not contain any ISSN which suggests that the references are wrong. Since the ISSN Register is not public, do not delete this page for this reason unless you received direct evidence from the ISSN organisation (www.issn.org), or the regional ISSN issuing centre, the National Széchényi Library of Hungary. Considering the similarities and the differences, the Factiva entry may also be an erroneous duplicate of "Turan Information Agency (Azerbaijan)" which is the only Azerbaijani periodical of this name to be online – both in Russian and in English.

External links
 Database entry in the Hungarian Periodicals Database (IKB), and the repertory of this periodical in the Repertory of Hungarian Periodicals (IKER), both maintained by the National Széchényi Library in Budapest, Hungary.
 Library catalogue entry in the Metropolitan Ervin Szabo Library, Budapest, Hungary.

1913 establishments in Austria-Hungary
Political magazines published in Hungary
Magazines established in 1913